Christian Benford (born September 21, 2000) is an American football cornerback for the Buffalo Bills of the National Football League (NFL). He played college football at Villanova.

Early life and high school
Benford was born in Baltimore, Maryland and grew up Randallstown, Maryland, where he attended Randallstown High School. He was named All-Metro and All-Baltimore County as a senior and played for Maryland in the Big 33 Football Classic. Benford committed to play college football at Villanova over an offer from Morgan State.

College career
Benford played in nine games with eight starts as a true freshman and was named the Colonial Athletic Association (CAA) Defensive Rookie of the Year and third-team All-CAA after making 49 tackles with six pass breakups and five interceptions. He played in ten games with seven starts as a sophomore and broke up five passes with one interception. Benford was named first-team All-CAA in his junior season, which was shortened and played in the spring of 2021 due to the COVID-19 pandemic in the United States. As a senior, Benford recorded 39 tackles with seven interceptions and an NCAA Division I FCS-leading 18 passes broken up and was again named first-team All-CAA.

Professional career

Benford was selected by the Buffalo Bills in the sixth round, 185th overall, of the 2022 NFL Draft. Benford began the season as the starting cornerback for the Bills along with Dane Jackson. In his debut against the  Los Angeles Rams he had 3 tackles and one pass defended. Benford fractured his hand in a week 3 loss to the  Miami Dolphins, missing only two games and coming back in a week six victory over the  Kansas City Chiefs. He was placed on injured reserve on November 26, 2022. He was activated from injured reserve on January 6, 2023.

References

External links
 Buffalo Bills bio
Villanova Wildcats bio

2000 births
Living people
People from Randallstown, Maryland
Players of American football from Maryland
Sportspeople from Baltimore County, Maryland
American football cornerbacks
Villanova Wildcats football players
Buffalo Bills players